Tyler Mitchell (born April 12, 1995) is an American photographer. He is based in Brooklyn, New York, and is best known for his cover photo of Beyoncé for the cover of Vogue.

Early life 
Mitchell grew up in Marietta, Georgia. In ninth grade, he purchased a Canon camera and taught himself how to make skateboarding videos. He was inspired by Spike Jonze to learn how to make videos and taught himself how to edit through YouTube tutorials. Mitchell attended The Westminster Schools of Atlanta.

In 2015, Mitchell created and published his first book at the age of 20 after visiting Havana, Cuba, on a six-week photography program. While he was there he documented skateboarding life and the architecture in Havana and turned it into a 108-page book called El Paquete.

Mitchell went on to attend New York University Tisch School of the Arts, where he studied cinematography in film and television. While at Tisch, he studied with Deborah Willis and graduated in 2017.

Career 
Before photographing Beyoncé for the cover of American Vogues September 2018 issue at the age of 23, he got a lot of experience making and editing short films at home and also shot music videos for rapper Kevin Abstract during his freshman year of college. Additionally, before the Vogue cover, Mitchell worked with Teen Vogue to document and photograph teen gun control activists for the magazine's digital issue. A couple months later, Mitchell became the first African American to photograph for the cover of American Vogue, and also one of the youngest photographers ever to do so. In 2019, the Smithsonian National Portrait Gallery acquired one of the portraits of Beyoncé by Mitchell for their permanent collection.

Mitchell has also shot for companies like Marc Jacobs, JW Anderson, Converse, Nike, and Givenchy. His work includes fashion photography, artistic photography, and film projects, which include autobiographical topics and themes of identity.

In 2019, Mitchell had his first solo exhibition at the Foam Fotografiemuseum Amsterdam from April 19 to June 5 called I Can Make You Feel Good, which included video works, photographs, and installations. The exhibition traveled to the International Center of Photography in New York and was shown there until May 2020.

Legacy and style 
Mitchell has been praised for documenting nuanced expressions of black life, which he has referred to as a "Black utopic vision". His exhibition I Can Make You Feel Good features photographs of black people enjoying daily life, predominantly outdoors, which The New York Times asserts "challenges the art historical renderings of leisure time as the purview of the white gentry." He explores cultural reclamation in his professional work as fashion photographer.

Mitchell cites Ryan McGinley and Larry Clark as early influences. His work has also been contextualized in reference to artists including Kehinde Wiley, Jamel Shabazz, and Nadine Ijewere.

Exhibitions 
I'm Doing Pretty Hood in My Pink Polo, Red Hook Labs Gallery and Aperture Gallery, 2018
Labs New Artists II (group exhibition), Red Hook Labs Gallery, Brooklyn, New York, June 2018
 The Way We Live Now (group exhibition), Aperture Foundation, New York City June – August 2018
 I Can Make You Feel Good, Foam Fotografiemuseum Amsterdam, April–June 2019
I Can Make You Feel Good, International Center of Photography, Jan 2020 – May 2020

Books 

 I Can Make You Feel Good. 2020.

Awards 
 Forbes 30 under 30 - Art & Style 2019
 British Fashion Council - New Wave Creative
 Dazed Digital - Dazed 100 2016
BET - BET's Future 40 list 2020
 2021 Award for Editorial, Advertising and Fashion Photography, Royal Photographic Society

References

External links 
 

Living people
African-American photographers
21st-century American photographers
The Westminster Schools alumni
People from Marietta, Georgia
1995 births
Photographers from Georgia (U.S. state)
Artists from Atlanta
American photographers
21st-century African-American artists